The 2000–01 Cymru Alliance was the eleventh season of the Cymru Alliance after its establishment in 1990. The league was won by Caernarfon Town.

League table

External links
Cymru Alliance

Cymru Alliance seasons
2
Wales